Turn of the Screw is the second studio album from punk rock band, 1208. It was released in February, 2004 and follows 2002's Feedback Is Payback – both released on Epitaph Records.

The song "Fall Apart" was featured on the popular PlayStation 2 and Xbox game Burnout 3.

Track listing
All songs written by 1208
"My Loss" – 3:30
"Fall Apart" – 3:08
"Tell Me Again" – 2:52
"Next Big Thing" – 3:04
"Time to Remember" – 2:33
"Smash the Badge" – 2:22
"Lost and Found" – 3:05
"Everyday" – 2:51
"From Below" – 2:36
"Hurts to Know" – 2:44
"All I Can Do" – 2:12
"Not You" – 3:14
"The Saint" – 3:12
"Turn of the Screw" – 1:56

Enhanced CD content
"Next Big Thing" music video – 3:04
Behind the scenes video – 4:13

Credits
 Alex – vocals
 Neshawn – guitar
 Bryan – bass
 Manny – drums, except tracks 10 and 13
 John Cranfield – drums on tracks 10 and 13
 Rodney Wertz – viola on track 13
 Recorded at Stall #2, Redondo Beach, California – except tracks 10 and 13 at Steak House, North Hollywood, California
 Produced by 1208 and Darian Rundall, except tracks 10 and 13 by Matt Hyde
 Engineered by Darian Rundall, except tracks 10 and 13 by Matt Hyde
 Mixed by Matt Hyde at Ameraycan
 Mastered by Eddie Schreyer at Oasis Mastering

Enhanced CD credits
 "Next Big Thing" music video directed and produced by Geno and Vinny Imbriale
 "Behind the Scenes" video by Stoney Sharpe

References

External links
Epitaph Records album page
Epitaph Records band page

2004 albums
1208 (band) albums
Epitaph Records albums